Palazzo Malta, officially named as the Magistral Palace, and also known as Palazzo di Malta or Palazzo dell'Ordine di Malta, is the more important of the two headquarters of the Sovereign Military Order of Malta (the other being Villa Malta), a Roman Catholic lay religious order and a sovereign subject of international law. It is located in Via dei Condotti, 68 in Rome, Italy, a few minutes' walk from the Spanish Steps, and has been granted extraterritoriality by the Italian Government. The Palace has been a property of the Order of Malta since 1630.

Context
On 12 June 1798, the French forces under Napoleon Bonaparte were seen over the horizon of the island of Malta, Malta had been the base of the Order of St. John of Jerusalem, also called the Order of Malta. The Order had been given the island by Charles V, Holy Roman Emperor in 1530. Napoleon left the island with a sizeable garrison and a handpicked administration. Following a Maltese uprising, the British Lord Nelson was asked and took over Malta on 5 September 1800. Malta was made a British colony on 30 March 1814 by the Treaty of Paris.

Thus, the Order of Malta was left without any territory, and it was effectively disbanded. It was restored, however, in 1834, under the new name "Sovereign Military Hospitaller Order of St. John of Jerusalem of Rhodes and of Malta", or simply the "Sovereign Military Order of Malta" (SMOM). New headquarters were set up at Palazzo Malta. In 1869, the Palazzo Malta, and the other headquarters of the Order, Villa Malta, were granted extraterritoriality. Today they are recognised by 110 countries as the independent headquarters of a sovereign entity, with mutual diplomatic relations established.

History

The building now called Palazzo Malta was purchased in the 16th century by the Maltese-born Italian archeologist Antonio Bosio, whose uncle was the representative of the Order of St. John to the Holy See. When Bosio died in 1629, he left the building to the Order, and it subsequently became the home of the Order's ambassador to the Holy See. When Carlo Aldobrandini became ambassador, he enlarged the building to its present size. The majority of governmental and administrative duties are also carried out in the building.

In the 1720s, Grand Master António Manoel de Vilhena entrusted Carlo Gimach with the restoration and additional decoration of the palace. This information is retrieved with the letters exchanged by the Grandmaster and the ambassador for the Order in Rome, Giambattista Spinola. Renovations included the addition of a grand fountain in the courtyard. The building remained an embassy until the entire Order moved its headquarters there in 1834.

The building was extensively renovated between 1889 and 1894, but most of the original characteristics were retained.

Matthew Festing, who served as Prince and Grand Master of the Sovereign Military Order of Malta, lived in the building from 2008 until his resignation in 2017, following a dispute with the Vatican.

Architecture
The building is made of ashlar blocks, and it is crowned with a corbelled cornice.

References

External links 
 Palazzo Malta on the Order of Malta official website
 Palazzo Malta on Youtube

Buildings and structures of the Sovereign Military Order of Malta
Malta
Rome R. IV Campo Marzio